The Finnish Transport Workers' Union (AKT) is a trade union representing transport workers in Finland.

The union was founded in 1970, when the Automobile and Transport Workers' Union merged with the Finnish Road Transport Union, and the Finnish Port Workers' Union. Some of these unions had been affiliated to the Finnish Federation of Trade Unions, and some to the Finnish Trade Union Federation. Soon after these two federations merged to form the Central Organisation of Finnish Trade Unions, the transport unions also merged.

By 1998, the union had 49,849 members, and this figure has remained fairly consistent. The union is based in Helsinki, and is divided into 121 professional groups. It is a member of the Nordic Transport Workers' Union, the European Transport Workers' Union, and the International Transport Workers' Federation.

Presidents

 1970–1978: Martti Veirto
 1978–1994: 
 1994–2001: Kauko Lehikoinen
 2001–2012: 
 2012–present:

References

Trade unions established in 1970
Trade unions in Finland
Transportation trade unions